Wicked as They Come (Portrait in Smoke in the United States) is a 1956 British film noir directed by Ken Hughes and starring Arlene Dahl, Philip Carey and Herbert Marshall.

Plot

Poor girl from the slums Katherine Allenbourg trades on her looks. She enters a beauty contest, then charms the elderly gentleman running it, Sam Lewis, into fixing it so she will win first prize, a trip to Europe. She promptly abandons Sam.

On a plane to London, after changing her name to Kathy Allen, she is attracted to Tim O'Bannion, who works for an ad agency. However, she's determined to land someone wealthier and photographer Larry Buckham, whom she meets at her London hotel, fits the bill. Invited to use his charge account at a department store for a wedding dress, Kathy makes many purchases, pawns the merchandise, and leaves Larry without a word.

She gets a job at Tim's advertising firm and seduces Stephen Collins, the man who runs it, and who is married. Tim arouses more passion in her, but Kathy's strictly out for herself. She demands Collins divorce his wife Virginia, whose father John Dowling owns the agency. Virginia tries to pay her off, but Kathy requests a transfer to the agency's Paris headquarters, where she immediately uses her wiles to get Dowling to marry her.

Anonymous threats begin by mail and phone. Someone in the shadows begins stalking her. Kathy picks up a gun and shoots, killing her husband. No one believes her tale of a prowler and Kathy is tried, convicted and sentenced to die.

Realizing that Larry is the man behind this turn of events, Tim reveals to him something he only just discovered, an explanation for Kathy's cruel treatment of men.  When she was a girl, she was brutally assaulted. Larry has a change of heart and confesses to stalking her. Kathy's prison sentence is reduced, and she hopes Tim will give her another chance once she gets out.

Cast
 Arlene Dahl as Kathleen "Kathy" Allen, née Allenbourg
 Philip Carey as Tim O'Bannion
 Herbert Marshall as Stephen Collins
 Michael Goodliffe as Larry Buckham
 Ralph Truman as John Dowling
 Sid James as Frank Allenbourg
 David Kossoff as Sam Lewis
 Faith Brook as Virginia Collins
 Frederick Valk as Mr. Reisner
 Marvin Kane as Mike Lewis
 Patrick Allen as Willie
 Gil Winfield as Chuck
 Jacques B. Brunius as Inspector Caron

Production
The film was based on a novel Portrait in Smoke which was published in 1950. The novel was adapted for TV in 1950.

In May 1955 it was announced Mike Frankovich had purchased the screen rights to the novel, to be made under his deal with Columbia. It was the third property Frankovich had purchased, the others being Joe MacBeth and ''Wise Guys Never Work. The film would be made by an associated company, Film Locations, run by Maxwell Setton.

Laurence Harvey was offered a lead role but turned it down. Lead roles eventually went to Arlene Dahl, Phil Carey and Herbert Marshall.

Filming was to have started in London on 28 November 1955 but eventually started 2 December 1955.

Reception
The Los Angeles Times said it was "written and directed with humor as well as ironic drama".

Filmink said "The film would have been better off following the lead of the poster art rather than the script: at heart this should have been a campy Joan Crawford vehicle but it’s far too reticent and dull."

Lawsuit
In March 1957 Arlene Dahl filed suit against Columbia for $1,000,000 claiming the advertising for the film was "obscene, degrading and offensive." She said she was humiliated by the use of composite drawings and photographs advertising the film. The case went to trial in May. The judge was unsympathetic during the hearing say he felt the photograph was refined. The case was dismissed in August.

References

External links
 
Wicked as They Come at BFI
Wicked as They Come at TCMDB
Wicked as They Come at Letterbox DVD
Wicked as They Come at Reel Streets
 

1956 films
Films directed by Ken Hughes
Columbia Pictures films
British black-and-white films
1950s English-language films
British crime films
1956 crime films